Nora Niland (26 March 1913 – 29 December 1988) was the County Librarian of Sligo and the founder of the Sligo municipal art collection.

Niland was born in 1913, the eighth child of the six sons and three daughters of John Niland and Elizabeth Loughlin of Ballinastack, Tuam, County Galway. In 1945 she became Sligo County Librarian.

Niland Collection

The Niland Collection is the name of Sligo's Municipal Art Collection. Named after Niland, who began the collection in the 1950s, it has since grown to over 300 works and is cared for by, and displayed at, The Model in Sligo, Ireland.

The collection was begun by Niland when she borrowed five works by Jack Butler Yeats to exhibit for the duration of the first Yeats Summer School in 1959. These works consisted of three large oil paintings, Communicating with Prisoners, The Funeral of Harry Boland, and The Island Funeral, along with two smaller watercolours, Market Day and The Star Gazer.

Final years

Niland never married. Upon her retirement she returned to live in Ballinastack. She died at St. James's Hospital, Dublin, in 1988. On the tenth anniversary of her death the gallery was renamed in her honor and moved to what had been the Model School on the Mall, Sligo.

References

People from County Galway
Irish librarians
Women librarians
1913 births
1988 deaths